Inokashira Park Zoo (Japanese: いのかしらしぜんぶんかえん; Kanji: 井の頭自然文化園) is a city zoo in Musashino, Tokyo. It is in a corner of Inokashira Park near the Ghibli Museum. A branch of the zoo is in Mitaka. It opened on May 17, 1942.

History 
In September 1905, Shibusawa Eiichi borrowed a corner of Inokashira Gotenyama Garden from the Imperial Family and founded the Tokyo Maternity Hospital Conversion Division (later Inokashira School) to accommodate juvenile delinquents. On May 1, 1917, the entire town was granted to Tokyo and Inokashira Park was opened. On May 5, 1934, "Nakanoshima small animal zoo" opened at the current branch location.

In 1939, when the Inokashira school relocated, the plan to build a big zoo in this area was advanced. Initially it was conceived as "a big zoo" comparable to the Ueno Zoo, but due to the wartime budget and supplies shortage, large animals can not be gathered. The plan changed to a "nature observation park". It opened on May 17, 1942.

Two giraffes were bred at the time of the opening, but both died by the end of the war.

Overview 
In 2006,  to reduce the risk of breeding, the Ministry of the Environment moved some endangered Tsushima leopard cats to the zoo.  Breeding restarted on February 22, 2008.

It is divided into a main zoo in Gotenyama, Musashino and a branch location in Inokashira, Mitaka. In the main park, mainly mammals and birds are raised, and waterfowl are kept in the garden surrounded by Inokashira pond. Also, there is a cultural museum, where special exhibitions and lectures or meetings are held. There was also a "tropical bird greenhouse", but on June 2, 2013 it closed due to its age. There is an aquarium with fish and amphibians in the secondary park.

A sculpture garden is in one corner of the park with works by Seibo Kitamura.  In addition, a small amusement park (a merry-go round, teacups, train) is in another corner of the park.

Animals 

The zoo displays 170 animal species focusing on native species and a few exotic species.

Main Park
Barn owl
Capybara
Copper pheasant
Crested porcupine
Eurasian otter
Fennec fox
Guinea pig
Humboldt penguin
Japanese green woodpecker
Japanese marten
Japanese scops owl
Japanese serow
Japanese sparrowhawk
Japanese squirrel
Japanese wood pigeon
Leopard cat
Masked palm civet
Meerkat
Patagonian mara
Rhesus macaque
Ryukyu flying fox
Sika deer
Wild boar

Aquatic Life Park
Black-faced spoonbill
Call duck
Grey heron
Japanese fire-bellied newt
Japanese giant salamander
Japanese night heron
Japanese rice fish
Lesser white-fronted goose
Mandarin duck
Musashi ninespine stickleback
Oriental stork
Tokyo bitterling
Whooper swan

Hanako 

Hanako (1947–2016) was a female Asian elephant that was kept the zoo. She was born in Thailand in 1947 and came to Japan for the first time after the war, gifted to Ueno Zoo in 1949. She inherited the name of the elephant "Hanako (Wanry)" who was starved to death during the war. Hanako toured the whole country and Tokyo under the Ueno Zoo's  "Mobile Zoo" project that began in 1950 and visited Inokashira Natural Culture Park for three consecutive years. On 5 March 1954 she was moved to Inokashira Park Zoo from Ueno Zoo.

In 1956, she stepped on and killed a man who was inebriated and trespassing before the garden opened. In 1960 she stepped on and killed a male keeper.

Her lower left teeth fell out in the 1980s, so she has been fed with a liquid diet consisting of banana and apple.  In 2013, Hanako broke the longevity record of elephants raised in Japan.  On May 26, 2016, she died at the age of 69.

References

External links 

 Inokashira Park Zoo
 Zoos and Aquariums of Tokyo

1942 establishments in Japan
Zoos in Japan
Museums in Tokyo
Zoos established in 1942
Musashino, Tokyo